Chukotka Autonomous Okrug is administratively divided into:
Towns under the autonomous okrug's jurisdiction:
Anadyr (Анадырь) (administrative center)
Districts:
Anadyrsky (Анадырский)
Urban-type settlements under the district's jurisdiction:
Otrozhny (Отрожный)
Shakhtyorsky (Шахтёрский)
Ugolnye Kopi (Угольные Копи)
Beringovsky (Беринговский)
Bilibinsky (Билибинский)
Towns under the district's jurisdiction:
Bilibino (Билибино)
Urban-type settlements under the district's jurisdiction:
Aliskerovo (Алискерово)
Dalny (Дальний)
Vesenny (Весенний)
Vstrechny (Встречный)
Chaunsky (Чаунский)
Towns under the district's jurisdiction:
Pevek (Певек)
Urban-type settlements under the district's jurisdiction:
Baranikha (Бараниха)
Bystry (Быстрый)
Komsomolsky (Комсомольский)
Krasnoarmeysky (Красноармейский)
Valkumey (Валькумей)
Yuzhny (Южный)
Chukotsky (Чукотский)
Iultinsky (Иультинский)
Urban-type settlements under the district's jurisdiction:
Egvekinot (Эгвекинот)
Leningradsky (Ленинградский)
Mys Shmidta (Мыс Шмидта)
Providensky (Провиденский)
Urban-type settlements under the district's jurisdiction:
Provideniya (Провидения)

Districts eliminated in 2011

Beringovsky District (Беринговский)
Shmidtovsky District (Шмидтовский)

References

Chukotka Autonomous Okrug
Chukotka Autonomous Okrug